Prikhodko (Приходько) is a gender-neutral Ukrainian surname. It may refer to:

Anastasia Prikhodko (born 1987), Ukrainian folk rock and traditional pop singer
Hilarion (Prikhodko), born Ivan Prikhodko (1924–2008), Russian priest
Sergei Aleksandrovich Prikhodko (born 1962), Russian football player
 Sergei Eduardovich Prikhodko (1957–2021), Russian politician, the main figure of the 2018 "Rybkagate" corruption scandal
 Sergei Sergeyevich Prikhodko (born 1984), Russian football player, son of Sergei Aleksandrovich

See also
 

Ukrainian-language surnames